Christian Cappek (born 25 July 1990) is a German footballer who plays as a forward.

Career

Cappek played as youth for FC Augsburg and TSV 1860 Munich before joining SV Wacker Burghausen in 2008, where he made his senior debut in a 3–1 3. Liga win over Kickers Emden. He came on as a substitute for David Solga and scored Burghausen's third goal in the 88th minute. After three years with Wacker, he signed for 2. Bundesliga side FC Erzgebirge Aue in July 2011. He was released on a free transfer in November 2012 after six appearances for the club, the last of which had come almost a year earlier. Two months later he signed for FC Augsburg II, where he spent half a season before joining Kickers Offenbach.

In the summer 2015, Cappek joined Chemnitzer FC.

References

External links

1990 births
Living people
German footballers
SV Wacker Burghausen players
FC Erzgebirge Aue players
FC Augsburg players
Kickers Offenbach players
Chemnitzer FC players
SV Wehen Wiesbaden players
2. Bundesliga players
3. Liga players
Association football forwards
Sportspeople from Augsburg
Footballers from Bavaria